Castro is a comune (municipality) in the Province of Bergamo in the Italian region of Lombardy, located about  northeast of Milan and about  northeast of Bergamo on the western side of the lake Iseo.

Castro borders the following municipalities: Lovere, Pianico, Pisogne, Solto Collina.

Demographic evolution

References